Jennifer Yee (born 14 June 1987) is a Canadian softball player. She competed in the women's tournament at the 2008 Summer Olympics. At the collegiate level she played for Niagara and Georgia Tech, later serving as an assistant coach at UMass Lowell while pursuing her graduate studies in mechanical engineering at the institution.

References

External links
 

1987 births
Living people
Canadian softball players
Olympic softball players of Canada
Softball players at the 2008 Summer Olympics
Sportspeople from Surrey, British Columbia
Niagara Purple Eagles athletes
Georgia Tech Yellow Jackets softball players
UMass Lowell River Hawks coaches